Diatraea centrellus is a moth in the family Crambidae. It was described by Heinrich Benno Möschler in 1883. It is found in Grenada, Suriname, French Guiana and Brazil.

References

Chiloini
Moths described in 1883